Rugby Club Lovcen was formed in 2015 at Cetinje, Montenegro.

See also
 Rugby union in Montenegro
 Montenegrin Rugby Union
 2014–16 European Nations Cup Third Division
 SD Lovćen Cetinje
 Cetinje

External links & Reference
 Rugby Club Lovćen official site

Rugby clubs established in 2015
Lovćen Cetinje
Montenegrin rugby union teams